Wojciech Paweł Saługa (born 27 March 1969 in Jaworzno) is a Polish economist and politician. He is the current Marshal of Silesia.

A graduate of the Kraków University of Economics, Saługa worked at ING Bank Śląski between 1994 and 2002. At the same time, Saługa was involved in municipal politics, elected as an alderman to the Jaworzno City Council between 1998 and 2002, and later served as the town's deputy mayor between 2002 and 2004.  He subsequently took a position in the Senate following a successful by-election in 2004 for Sosnowiec as a Civic Platform candidate. He was elected to the Sejm representing the Sosnowiec constituency in the 2005 parliamentary election, winning reelection again in 2007 and 2011. Saługa resigned from the Sejm in December 2014.

In December 2014, Saługa was elected as the seventh Marshal of Silesia by the Civic Platform, Polish People's Party and Democratic Left Alliance coalition within the Silesian Regional Assembly, becoming the chief executive of the province. As the head of the province's executive board, Saługa invited the Silesian Autonomy Movement to join the board's coalition in June 2015.

See also
Members of Polish Sejm 2005-2007
Members of Polish Sejm 2007-2011

References

External links
Wojciech Saługa Sejm page - includes declarations of interest, voting record, and transcripts of speeches.
Executive board official website

1969 births
Living people
People from Jaworzno
Civic Platform politicians
Members of the Senate of Poland 2001–2005
Members of the Polish Sejm 2005–2007
Members of the Polish Sejm 2007–2011
Members of the Polish Sejm 2011–2015
Members of the Polish Sejm 2015–2019
Members of the Polish Sejm 2019–2023
Voivodeship marshals of Poland
Silesian Voivodeship